The Sierra Leone worm lizard (Cynisca degrysi) is a species of amphisbaenian in the family Amphisbaenidae. The species is endemic to Sierra Leone.

Etymology
The specific name, degrysi, is in honor of German zoologist Pedro de Grys.

Description
C. degrysi is pale brown dorsally, and white ventrally.

Reproduction
C. degrysi is oviparous.

References

Further reading
Gans C (2005). "Checklist and Bibliography of the Amphisbaenia of the World". Bulletin of the American Museum of Natural History (289): 1–130. (Cynisca degrysi, p. 28).
Loveridge A (1941). "Revision of the African Lizards [sic] of the Family Amphisbaenidae". Bulletin of the Museum of Comparative Zoölogy at Harvard College 87 (5): 353–451. (Placogaster degrysi, new species, p. 400).

Cynisca (lizard)
Reptiles described in 1941
Taxa named by Arthur Loveridge
Endemic fauna of Sierra Leone